Laoupanga is a village in the commune of Nyambaka in the Adamawa Region of Cameroon, located on the road from Ngaoundéré to Wouro Sangue

Population 
In 1967, Laoupanga comptait 194 inhabitants, mostly Fula people At the time of the 2005 census, there were 424 people in the village.

References

Bibliography
 Jean Boutrais (ed.), Peuples et cultures de l'Adamaoua (Cameroun) : actes du colloque de Ngaoundéré, du 14 au 16 janvier 1992, ORSTOM, Paris ; Ngaoundéré-Anthropos, 1993, 316 p. 
 Dictionnaire des villages de l'Adamaoua, ONAREST, Yaoundé, October 1974, 133 p.

External links
 Nyambaka, on the website Communes et villes unies du Cameroun (CVUC)

Populated places in Adamawa Region